Prospect is an unincorporated community in Champaign County, Illinois, United States. Prospect is west of Rantoul.

References

Unincorporated communities in Champaign County, Illinois
Unincorporated communities in Illinois